Leptotyphlopinae (commonly called slender blind snakes or threadsnakes) are a subfamily of snakes found in equatorial Africa.

Taxonomy
 Genus Epacrophis [Hedges, Adalsteinsson, & Branch, 2009] (3 species)
 Genus Leptotyphlops [Fitzinger, 1843] (21 species)
 Genus Myriopholis [Hedges, Adalsteinsson, & Branch, 2009] (23 species)
 Genus Namibiana [Hedges, Adalsteinsson, & Branc, 2009] (5 species)

References